Violence is the third album by the Washington, D.C.-based alternative metal band Nothingface. The album was released on September 5, 2000, via TVT Records. The album received positive reviews, but didn't experience mainstream popularity, selling only 87,000 copies in the United States.

Production
Early demos for the album were recorded in September 1999, including several songs which would end up being cut from the final track list. On March 10, 2000 the band flew to Canada, arriving at a studio located in Vancouver, British Columbia to begin recording Violence, spending six weeks in the city.

In a 2017 interview, drummer Chris Houck stated he learned that he had dangerously high blood pressure levels prior to recording the album, which would eventually lead to him leaving the band. 

At the time, the members of Nothingface referred to Violence as "the soundtrack for the end of the world."

Critical reception
Violence received positive reviews. CMJ included it in their "Best Loud Rock Albums" of 2000 and called it, "A complex collection of stellar songs... with a flesh-slicing, hate-infused edge... the year's finest heavy-with-melody album." AllMusic gave the album 4 stars out of 5 and said, "The combo strives for freshness and originality, providing a compelling blend of melody and brute force." The band described the album as "the soundtrack for the end of the world." The Morning Call described the album as "whatever metal". In 2015, VH1 ranked the album fourth on their list of "The 12 Most Underrated Nu Metal Albums".

Track listing

Personnel
Nothingface
Matt Holt – vocals
Tom Maxwell – guitar
Bill Gaal – bass, keyboards, samples
Chris Houck – drums

Additional personnel
Drew Mazurek – producer, engineering
Paul Silveira – assistant engineering, Pro Tools digital editing
Davor Vulama – assistant engineering
David Bottrill – mixing, digital editing
Josh Wilbur – assistant mixing engineer, digital editing
Ted Jensen – mastering
Benjamin Wheelock – art design

Chart positions

References

2000 albums
Nothingface albums
TVT Records albums
Albums recorded at Armoury Studios